Oxalis obliquifolia  is an Oxalis species found from Ethiopia to South Africa.

References

External links

obliquifolia